Pray.com is a Christian social networking service and mobile app that serves as a social media platform for religious communities. The Pray platform includes social media, daily prayers, sermons, biblical content, and podcasts. Pray.com was founded in 2016 by Steve Gatena, Michael Lynn, Ryan Beck and Matthew Potter.

Pray.com platform

Social media 
Pray.com serves as a social media platform for religious communities. Congregations can create their own groups on the platform, where members and leaders can engage in discussions, livestream services, and solicit and receive donations. The social media communities on Pray.com allow members to participate in “prayer communities” where Pray users are able to ask for and answer prayer requests.

Biblical content 
A paid subscription includes access to premium audio content, such as biblically-inspired meditations and bedtime stories, and Bible stories for children. Pray.com produces Radio drama style with actors voicing stories from the bible. Some of the actors have been Kristen Bell and Blair Underwood.

History

Funding 
In June 2017, Pray.com announced it had raised $2 million in seed funding, led by Science Inc. with participation from Greylock Partners and Spark Capital. In March 2018, Pray.com announced it had raised an additional $14 million in a Series A round led by TPG Growth with participation from Science Inc. and Greylock Partners. Gatena, in an interview with Bloomberg News, recalled a mixed reception to faith-based technology from a few venture capital firms: “A few were very disrespectful and borderline discriminatory against our customers."

COVID-19 pandemic 
Due to the COVID-19 pandemic's limitations on religious gatherings, Pray.com has experienced major growth in active users, subscribers, and downloads. Downloads for Pray.com increased by 955% during the pandemic. During the pandemic, Pray.com partnered with churches to provide a platform for their ministries while in-person services were restricted by law.

National Day of Prayer 
Pray first hosted a National Day of Prayer event in 2020 when it streamed to nearly one million viewers on Facebook. 

In 2021, Pray hosted a virtual event for the National Day of Prayer in the United States. The event featured remarks from public figures including United States President Joe Biden and former Vice President Mike Pence. President Biden spoke of his faith and prayed for an end to the COVID-19 pandemic. Biden remarked: “It means the world to me to know that there are people across the country who include Jill and me in their prayers. And I hope you know that you and your families are in our prayers as well. Today I am praying for the end of this great COVID crisis.”  The event featured musical performances from Gary Valenciano, Brooke Ligertwood from the Christian band Hillsong Worship, Lecrae, Heather Headley and Michael Neale. Other notable speakers included Ronnie Floyd, Ed Young (pastor), Mark Driscoll, and Samuel Rodriguez. Pray.com partnered with Sirius XM, DirecTV and Facebook to stream the event across multiple platforms. Pray.com was featured as a pop-up channel on Sirius XM, channel 154, to host the prayer event and celebrate people of all faith.

FEC opinion 
The Federal Election Commission, in 2021, issued an opinion that will allow Pray.com to feature members of the United States Congress on its platform.

References

External links
 

Internet properties established in 2016
Social networking services
Mobile applications